Cameron Roth Gellman (born October 10, 1998) is an American actor known for his work as Rick Tyler / Hourman in the DC Universe series Stargirl.

Early life 
Gellman is a native of the Saint Louis, Missouri area.

Career
Gellman guest-starred on The Good Doctor.

Filmography

Film

Television

References

External links

Living people
American television actors
21st-century American male actors
1998 births
People with type 1 diabetes